Colonel John Banks Brady  (7 November 1875 – 13 February 1952) was a British-born Southern Rhodesian soldier, educator and politician who served as the member for Bulawayo North along with Allan Ross Welsh from 1933 to 1935 and later Bulawayo East in the Southern Rhodesian Legislative Assembly.

Early life 
John Banks Brady was born on 7 November 1875 in Ennistymon to national bank manager John Henry Banks and Isabella Banks. He was educated at Midleton College and Trinity College Dublin. He is of Anglo-Irish descent.

Career

South African War, settling in South Africa, and move to Southern Rhodesia 
John Banks Brady arrived in South Africa in 1900 to fight in the Second Boer War. He remained in South Africa to pursue his career. In 1909, he went to Southern Rhodesia as a result of J. B. M. Hertzog's pro-Afrikaner and anti-British policies. Brady became the Inspector of Schools in Southern Rhodesia. On the outbreak of war in 1914, Brady was recommissioned as a Lieutenant in the reserves, and then promoted to captain in the King's Royal Rifle Corps in November 1914

Return to Southern Rhodesia and entrance to politics 
Brady was the headmaster of the Milton School in Bulawayo from 1925 to 1930. He later entered politics and was elected the member of parliament for Bulawayo North along with Allan Ross Welsh in the 1933 Southern Rhodesian general election. Upon his retirement from the Army in 1937, he was promoted to Colonel. He was later elected the member of parliament for Bulawayo East in the 1939 election, a post he served in until 1946.

Later life 
With the outbreak of World War II, Brady returned to active service as a Military Observer and Liaison Officer for Southern Rhodesia to the Middle East Campaign. However, ill-health forced his retirement, and he was awarded the Officer of the Order of the British Empire (OBE) in 1943 for his service.

Brady died on 13 February 1952 at the age 76 in Bulawayo General Hospital from cardiac syncope and lobar pneumonia.

Honours

References 

People educated at Midleton College
Alumni of Trinity College Dublin
Rhodesian politicians
Members of the Legislative Assembly of Southern Rhodesia
People from County Clare
Rhodesian educators
White Rhodesian people
British Army personnel of the Second Boer War
British Army personnel of World War I
Rhodesian military personnel of World War I
Southern Rhodesian military personnel of World War II
King's Royal Rifle Corps officers
1875 births
1952 deaths
Companions of the Distinguished Service Order
Officers of the Order of the British Empire
British emigrants to Southern Rhodesia